was a Japanese statesman, courtier and politician during the Nara period.

Career at court
He was a minister during the reign of Empress Shōtoku.  He held positions of hyōbu-kyō (chief military officer) and sangi (associate counselor).

Shōtoku placed her imperial bodyguards under the command of Kurajimaro.

In 764, Kurajimaro was a leader of forces opposing Fujiwara no Nakamaro, also known as Emi no Oshikatsu. Nakamaro and others unsuccessfully plotted with Emperor Junnin against retired Empress Kōken and the monk Dōkyō resulting in a military confrontation known as Fujiwara no Nakamaro Rebellion.

After stability was restored, Kurajimaro was placed in charge of the party escorting Emperor Junnin to Awaji province.

Genealogy
Kurajimaro was the ninth son of Fujiwara no Umakai.

Notes

References
 Nussbaum, Louis-Frédéric and Käthe Roth. (2005).  Japan encyclopedia. Cambridge: Harvard University Press. ;  OCLC 58053128
 Titsingh, Isaac. (1834).  Annales des empereurs du Japon (Nihon Odai Ichiran).  Paris: Royal Asiatic Society, Oriental Translation Fund of Great Britain and Ireland. OCLC 5850691

734 births
775 deaths
Fujiwara clan
People of Nara-period Japan